Moulder Peak is a sharp peak  southeast of Mount Rosenthal in the Liberty Hills of the Heritage Range, Antarctica. It was named by the Advisory Committee on Antarctic Names for storekeeper Andrew B. Moulder, U.S. Navy, who was fatally injured in a cargo unloading accident at South Pole Station, February 13, 1966.

See also
 Mountains in Antarctica

References

Mountains of Ellsworth Land